Caroline Delas (born 27 February 1980 in Langon, Gironde) is a female competition rower from France. A silver medal winner at the 2005 Mediterranean Games she represented her native country at the 2004 Summer Olympics in Athens, Greece.

References

External links 
 

1980 births
Living people
French female rowers
Olympic rowers of France
Rowers at the 2004 Summer Olympics
People from Langon, Gironde
Mediterranean Games silver medalists for France
Competitors at the 2005 Mediterranean Games
Sportspeople from Gironde
Mediterranean Games medalists in rowing
20th-century French women
21st-century French women